Sipapoantha is a genus of flowering plants belonging to the family Gentianaceae.

Its native range is Venezuela to Northern Brazil.

Species:

Sipapoantha obtusisepala 
Sipapoantha ostrina

References

Gentianaceae
Gentianaceae genera